Rackam is a Canadian manufacturer and distributor of solar thermal collectors, and a specialist of industrial energy efficiency and heat transfer processes. The company uses solar heat to create saturated steam, high-temperature oil, and hot water; this is in turn used for industrial heating, drying, cooling and refrigeration.

Engineering companies of Canada
Companies based in Quebec
Canadian companies established in 2007
Privately held companies of Canada
Solar energy companies
Technology companies established in 2007
2007 establishments in Quebec